Nushki Railway Station (Balochi: نوشکی ریلوے اسٹیشن) is located in Nushki town, Nushki district of Balochistan province of the Pakistan.

It is part of the ancient Indo-Persian route from Quetta to Sistan. The Quetta to Sistan route was opened in 1897.

See also
 List of railway stations in Pakistan
 Pakistan Railways

References

Railway stations in Nushki District
Railway stations on Quetta–Taftan Railway Line
Railway stations in Balochistan, Pakistan